The 1973 Dartmouth Indians football team was an American football team that represented Dartmouth College during the 1973 NCAA Division I football season. Dartmouth was the outright Ivy League champion for the second straight year, and claimed a share of the title for a fifth straight year.

In their third season under head coach Jake Crouthamel, the Indians compiled a 6–3 record and outscored opponents 184 to 119. Thomas C. Csatari and Herbert Hopkins were the team captains.

The Indians' 6–1 conference record was the best in the Ivy League. Dartmouth outscored Ivy opponents 175 to 99.

This would be the last season for the "Dartmouth Indians" team name. In 1974, the college trustees ruled "use of the [Indian] symbol in any form to be inconsistent with present institutional and academic objectives of the college in advancing Native American education." That fall, all Dartmouth teams changed their name to "Big Green", which had long been used by the press as an alternative nickname for Dartmouth athletics teams.

Dartmouth played its home games at Memorial Field on the college campus in Hanover, New Hampshire.

Schedule

References

Dartmouth
Dartmouth Big Green football seasons
Ivy League football champion seasons
Dartmouth Indians football